Laplap (sometimes wrongly spelled lap lap) is the national dish of Vanuatu. Laplap is prepared by grating breadfruit, bananas, taro or yam roots into a vegetable paste. The paste is then wrapped in banana leaves and cooked in an underground stone oven, with fresh coconut cream. Meats like pork, beef, chicken or flying fox can be added.

References 

Vanuatuan cuisine
National dishes
Bislama words and phrases